Nipecotic acid is a GABA uptake inhibitor used in scientific research.

See also 
 Deramciclane
 Tiagabine
  Niacin

References 

3-Piperidinyl compounds
GABA reuptake inhibitors
Glycine receptor antagonists